"Salvage" is episode 13 of season 4 in the television show Angel, originally broadcast on the WB television network. After discovering Lilah’s dead body, a grieving Wesley breaks rogue slayer Faith out of prison so she can help track down Angelus. Meanwhile, Lorne performs a sanctuary spell to keep Angelus out of the hotel while Cordelia—secretly revealed to be the big evil controlling the Beast—confides in Connor that she is pregnant.

Plot
Angelus, who has been stalking Lilah, is disappointed when he finds her already dead. Wesley and Gunn discover him holding her body, drinking whatever is left of her blood; he escapes through a window, allowing the two to assume he killed her. Downstairs, when Wesley and Gunn return to the lobby with news of Lilah's death, Lorne suggests protecting the hotel with the same magic that forbids violence at his club. When the group realizes that Angelus could have turned Lilah into a vampire, Wesley offers to prevent her potential rising.

Angelus visits a demon bar—where he is raucously received—to question the patrons on the whereabouts of the Beast. In the basement, Wesley prepares to behead Lilah. After an imaginary conversation where he apologizes for their "not-a-relationship", he finally brings down the ax. Connor intends to destroy Angelus despite Cordelia's protests, but when he starts to leave, Cordelia faints mid-speech and Connor stops to care for her.

Meanwhile,  Slayer Faith works out in prison until another prisoner threatens her with a knife. Faith efficiently knocks the woman out. As the corrections officer hauls the other prisoner away, reassuring Faith they saw how she was attacked, Faith notices the ornate Bringer knife that was used.  Angelus follows the scent of Lilah's blood to the weapon used to kill her, in the Beast's possession. The Beast says Angelus is a part of his master's plans, but Angelus refuses to take orders and leaves. Cordelia—revealed as the Beast's master—is disappointed. The Beast apologizes for his failures and she forgives him, then the two kiss.

Lorne performs the protection spell, and Wesley returns from the basement saying he intends to restore Angel's soul. Wesley visits Faith at the prison to ask for her help; although initially disinterested, upon learning that Angelus has "returned," she crashes through the glass, knocks out the prison guards, and jumps out of the high window with Wesley. (The clear implication is that Faith could have escaped prison any time she liked and only remained there as part of her self-imposed redemption efforts.) Faith tells him that she won't kill Angelus because of Angel's crucial role in her life and Wesley admits that's precisely why he chose her for the job. When they arrive at the hotel, Faith asserts herself as commander. Connor is displeased with her decision to rescue Angelus, not kill him, but Faith makes it clear her plan is the only plan.

Angelus, after overhearing a Slayer is in town, immediately calls Buffy Summers's house. When Dawn Summers confirms her sister is still in  Sunnydale, he realizes Faith must be the Slayer on the loose. Connor leads Faith, Wesley and Gunn into a factory (where Angelus has, with typical sardonic intent, erected a "Welcome, Faith" banner) and despite Faith's orders, beheads the first vampire that crosses his path. Faith yells at the teen for disobeying her and then tells him to go home because he refuses to listen to her. The two fight, but Faith is clearly stronger and eventually holds a crossbow to Connor's throat in warning. Connor returns to the hotel with Gunn, as Wesley and Faith split up to search the factory.

Faith finds Angelus with the Beast; she is badly beaten by the creature  until Angelus stabs the Beast with a dagger made of the Beast's flesh, killing the demon and restoring the sun. Faith knocks out a large window, flooding the room with sunlight, forcing Angelus to keep his distance. At the hotel, the gang rejoices in the return of the sun and Connor goes upstairs to tell Cordelia. Connor sings Faith's praises until Cordy interrupts with news that she's pregnant with his child.

Production details

Writing
Writer David Fury was pleased to write for Faith's character again: "I love her voice. And for whatever reason, her voice just comes to me," he says. "She has an attitude that is fun to write, saying things that are provocative or dirty or slightly off-color... That's the stuff that's most comfortable for me to do."  However, he found writing the scene between Lilah and Wesley challenging because he'd never written for Lilah before, although it "turned out better than I imagined," Fury says.

Arc significance

 Faith escapes from prison to help the Angel Investigations team find Angelus.
 Angelus kills the Beast and the sun returns. 
 It is revealed that "Cordelia" is the master of the Beast, and she reveals to Connor that she is pregnant with his child.

Continuity

Crossover with Buffy the Vampire Slayer: While in prison, Faith is attacked by an inmate hired by the Bringers, agents of the First Evil who try to eliminate the Slayer line in Season Seven of Buffy the Vampire Slayer. The inmate, Debbie, is played by Spice Williams-Crosby, who previously played a human assassin working for the demonic Order of Taraka in "What's My Line, Part Two"; it could be inferred that the two demon-employed criminals are in fact the same person, but the episode offers no clarification on this point.
When Angelus calls Buffy's house, he talks to Dawn Summers. This phone call is not shown in any Buffy episode. Furthermore, the phone call represents the only interaction between Angel / Angelus and Dawn in either Buffy or Angel.
This episode also reconciles Wesley and Faith for the first time to finally work together as Watcher and Slayer. In Season Three of Buffy Wesley had been sent to Sunnydale to officially replace Rupert Giles as both Buffy and Faith's watcher, which never worked out as Faith never worked with him or Giles since she had her own agenda set up as a rogue Slayer, which later turned her into a rogue criminal for hire. Their other brief encounter since Sunnydale had seen Wesley abducted and brutally tortured by Faith when she was hired to kill Angel by Wolfram & Hart, and her departure in the next episode by voluntarily turning herself to the authorities in search of redemption.

References

External links

 

Angel (season 4) episodes
2003 American television episodes
Buffyverse crossover episodes